Leszek Pokładowski (born 19 May 1974) is a retired Polish football defender.

References

1974 births
Living people
Polish footballers
Pogoń Szczecin players
GKS Bełchatów players
Kujawiak Włocławek players
Ruch Chorzów players
Association football defenders